Joaquín Villalba (born 29 September 1928) is a Spanish modern pentathlete. He competed at the 1960 Summer Olympics.

References

1928 births
Living people
Spanish male modern pentathletes
Olympic modern pentathletes of Spain
Modern pentathletes at the 1960 Summer Olympics
Sportspeople from Pamplona